Hellbillies is a Norwegian rock band, formed in 1990 in a town called Ål, located in Hallingdal. 

pronunciation: h'ellbillies

Biography 
As of 2012, they have released thirteen albums—including a compilation and two live albums—as well as two live concert DVDs. They are among Norway's most popular recording artists.

Their lyrics are written and sung in the dialect of the Hallingdal area of Norway and there is evidence of influence from traditional (folk) Norwegian music, giving a distinctive "Norwegian" flavor to their country music.

Their early albums often included songs originally recorded by country music artists from the US with Hellbillies writing new lyrics in Norwegian. Later efforts have included much more original material that reflect contemporary Norwegian people and Norwegian life and issues. They have also gradually changed their musical style from country to rock.

They have collaborated with musicians from the US. For example, Rob Hajacos from Nashville, who plays fiddle on most Garth Brooks albums,  plays on three of Hellbillies’ albums.

In 2013 Hellbillies appeared at the Kongsberg Jazz Festival performing together with Jazz guests the Violin virtuoso Ola Kvernberg and the super trumpeter Mathias Eick. In 2013 they also contributed to the book "Think like a rockstar" Tenk som en rockestjerne, written by Ståle Økland.

Band members 

Current members
 Aslag Haugen - lead vocals, electric and acoustic guitars (1990–present)
 Lars Håvard Haugen - electric guitars, harmony and lead vocals (1990–present)
 Bjørn Gunnar Sando - drums (1990–present)

Live and studio members
 Egil Stemkens - bass, harmony vocals (2016–present)
 Lars Christian Narum - piano and organ (2003–present)

Former members
 Arne Moslåtten - accordion, flute, acoustic guitar, percussion (1990-2013), lyrics (1990-today)
 Arne Henry Sandum - bass (1990-2016)
 Lasse Hafreager - piano and organ (1993-2000)
 Trond Nagell Dahl - piano and organ (2001-2003)

Honors 
1993: Spellemannprisen in the class Country-rock awarded for the album Pela Stein
2007: Spellemannprisen awarded 'This year's spellemann for the album Spissrotgang
2022: Spellemannprisen awarded the honorary award for their long running career.

Discography

Studio albums 
"Sylvspente Boots" (1992)
"Pela Stein" (1993)
"Lakafant" (1995)
"Drag" (1996)
"Sol Over Livet" (1999)
"Urban Twang" (2001)
"Niende" (2004)
"Spissrotgang "(2007)
"Leite etter Lykka" (2010)
"Tretten" (2012)
"Søvnlaus" (2016)
"Blå Dag" (2021)

Singles & Ep's 

 "Hallo Telenor" (2007)
 "Den finast eg veit (2013)" (2013)
 "Dirkefri Live" (2014)
 "I eksil på sundrehall" (2020)
 "Blå dag" (2020)

Compilation albums 
"Røta - Hellbillies beste" (2006)

Live albums 
"LIVe LAGA"  (1997)
"CoolTur" (2002)
"Levande Live" (2014)

References

External links 
Official Website

Norwegian rock music groups
Norwegian country rock groups
Spellemannprisen winners
Musical groups established in 1990
1990 establishments in Norway
Musical groups from Buskerud
Ål